Michelle Butterly (born 5 February 1970) is an English actress.

Career
She graduated from the Central School of Speech and Drama. She has played Julie Oldroyd in Soldier Soldier in 1997, Melanie Dyson in Casualty from 1999 to 2001, and she has appeared in Pie in the Sky, The Bill, No Angels, Midsomer Murders, and Dangerfield. She appeared for two series as Ms Perin in the BBC2 sitcom Beautiful People, and played Trudy in the fifth series of Benidorm.

References 
 

English television actresses
English soap opera actresses
Living people
1970 births
Actresses from Liverpool